Wardrip is a surname. Notable people with the surname include:

Faryion Wardrip (born 1959), American serial killer
Noah Wardrip-Fruin, American academic